Benjamin Kweku Ayesu-Attah (born 28 April 1993) is a Canadian sprinter specialising in the 400 metres. He won the gold medal at the 2017 Jeux de la Francophonie.

International competitions

Personal bests

Outdoor
200 metres – 21.31 (-0.8 m/s) (Orem 2014)
400 metres – 46.20 (Edmonton 2016)

Indoor
200 metres – 21.90 (Moscow, ID 2016)
400 metres – 47.23 (Albuquerque 2013)

References

1993 births
Living people
Canadian male sprinters
Canadian people of Ghanaian descent
Universiade gold medalists for Canada
Universiade medalists in athletics (track and field)
Medalists at the 2013 Summer Universiade
Competitors at the 2017 Summer Universiade
21st-century Canadian people